The Asian Library is an academic library located on the Vancouver campus of the University of British Columbia, which houses the Asian languages collections of the University of British Columbia pertaining to Asian studies and Asia. The architecture of the Asian Centre building, in which the Asian Library is located, is based on a traditional pagoda, and the building was designed by Donald Matsuba at the cost of $1.6 million Canadian dollars. The building was intended to be a centennial gift funded by the Government of Japan, serving as a symbol of Asian-Canadian and Canada–Japan relations.
The Asian studies idea was created by Geoffrey Brian Hainsworth and a few of his colleagues.

References

University of British Columbia
Academic libraries in Canada
University of British Columbia libraries